Mark Pilkington (born 17 March 1978) is a Welsh professional golfer.

Career
Pilkington was born in Bangor, Gwynedd. He enjoyed a successful amateur career, representing Wales at all levels, and highlighted by winning the Welsh Amateur Championship in 1998. He turned professional later that year, immediately after winning a place on the European Tour at final qualifying school.

Pilkington had an unsuccessful rookie season on the European Tour in 1999, and played on the Challenge Tour the following season after failing to regain his card at qualifying school. He followed up a consistent Challenge Tour season with success at qualifying school to return to the top level for 2001. He managed to retain his European Tour card by finishing inside the top 100 on the Order of Merit in both 2001 and 2002, but his form dipped in 2003 and he dropped back down to the second tier for 2004.

After two largely unsuccessful seasons on the Challenge Tour, Pilkington's fortunes were revived in 2006 when he produced consistently good performances to finish the season on top of the Challenge Tour Rankings. After a slow start to the season, he recorded back to back second-place finishes, before rounding off the season with victory in the Kazakhstan Open and another runners-up prize at the Apulia San Domenico Grand Final. By topping the money list, he had regained his card on the European Tour; but in 2007 he finished in 136th place on the Order of Merit to again lose his place on the elite tour.

Amateur wins
1996 Peter McEvoy Trophy
1998 Welsh Amateur Championship

Professional wins (2)

Challenge Tour wins (1)

Challenge Tour playoff record (0–1)

Other wins (1)
2019 Welsh PGA Championship

Results in major championships

Note: Pilkington only played in The Open Championship.

CUT = missed the half-way cut

Team appearances
Amateur
European Boys' Team Championship (representing Wales): 1995, 1996
European Amateur Team Championship (representing Wales): 1997
European Youths' Team Championship (representing Wales): 1998 (winners)

See also
2006 Challenge Tour graduates

References

External links

Welsh male golfers
European Tour golfers
Sportspeople from Bangor, Gwynedd
1978 births
Living people